Qi Baishi is a crater on Mercury. The crater was named after famed Chinese painter Qi Baishi. The crater has an asymmetric pattern of ejecta rays, which formed by an object traveling to the east or to the west and impacting Mercury's surface at a very low incidence angle. However, Qi Baishi crater is still roughly circular, which is in contrast to the elongated shape of neighboring Hovnatanian crater.

References

Impact craters on Mercury